Mashin Sentai Kiramager is a Japanese tokusatsu television series, the first series in the franchise filmed in the  Reiwa period and the 44th entry of the Toei Company's long-running Super Sentai franchise produced by TV Asahi. The series follows the Kiramagers, Earthlings chosen by the extraterrestrial genie princess Mabushina of the planet Crystaria, as they fight back against the evil Yodonheim Empire's invasion of Earth.

Episodes

References

Kiramager
Mashin Sentai Kiramager